Bastile Glacier is located on the north slopes of Mount Baker in the North Cascades, U.S. state of Washington.

See also 
 List of glaciers in the United States

References

External links 

Glaciers of Mount Baker
Glaciers of Washington (state)